Domenico Millelire was one of four s built for the  (Royal Italian Navy) during the late 1920s.

Design and description
They displaced  surfaced and  submerged. Their crew numbered 77 officers and enlisted men.

For surface running, the boats were powered by two  diesel engines, each driving one propeller shaft. When submerged each propeller was driven by a  electric motor.

The boats were armed with six internal  torpedo tubes, four in the bow and two in the stern, for which they carried a dozen torpedoes. They were also armed with a single  deck gun, forward of the conning tower, for combat on the surface. Their anti-aircraft armament consisted of two  machine guns.

Construction and service
Domenico Millelire was laid down on 26 January 1925 at the Odero-Terni-Orlando shipyard in Muggiano, La Spezia. She was launched on 19 September 1927 and commissioned on 11 August 1928.

See also
 Italian submarines of World War II

References

Bibliography

External links
 Domenico Millelire Marina Militare website

Balilla-class submarines
World War II submarines of Italy
Ships built in La Spezia
Ships built by OTO Melara
1927 ships